The Senate (Sénat) is the upper house of the bicameral Parliament of the Republic of Congo (Parlement). It has 72 members (six for each of the 12 regions), elected for a six-year term by district, local and regional councils. 

The Senate was established in 1992. Prior to the 2008 Senate election, it had 66 members; it was expanded to 72 members at that time to account for the creation of Pointe-Noire Region. 

Senators serve terms of six years each.

Notable people
 

Alphonse-Mexil Etongo
Marcel Moufouma-Okia

See also
List of presidents of the Senate of the Republic of the Congo

References

Congo
Government of the Republic of the Congo
1992 establishments in the Republic of the Congo